Fairfield Area High School is a small, rural, public high school located in the borough of Fairfield, Pennsylvania, United States. The school serves students from most of southwestern Adams County. In 2016, enrollment was reported as 366 pupils in 9th through 12th grades. The school employed 29 full-time teachers.

The school's mascot is the Green Knight. The school is part of the Fairfield Area School District.

Extracurriculars
Fairfield Area School District offers a wide variety of clubs and activities, and an extensive sports program. The bulk of the programs and associated spending are centered on the high school students.

Sports
The district funds:

Boys:
Baseball – AA
Basketball – AA
Cross country – A
Football – A
Golf – AA
Soccer – A
Track and field – AA
Wrestling	- AA

Girls:
Basketball – AA
Cross country – A
Field hockey – AA
Soccer (fall) – A
Softball – AA
Track and field – AA
Volleyball – AA

The high school's sports programs are fed by the middle school's sports.
Middle school sports:

Boys:
Basketball
Soccer
Track and field
Wrestling	

Girls:
Basketball
Field hockey
Softball 
Track and field
Volleyball

Source

References

Public high schools in Pennsylvania
Schools in Adams County, Pennsylvania